The 2017 Ulster Senior Football Championship was the 129th instalment of the annual Ulster Senior Football Championship organised by the Ulster GAA. It is one of the four provincial competitions of the 2017 All-Ireland Senior Football Championship. The winners receive The Anglo-Celt Cup.

Tyrone are the defending champions. The draw for the Championship was made on 13 October 2016. Tyrone beat Down in the final with a score of 2-17 to 0-15.

Teams
The Ulster championship is contested by the nine county teams in the province of Ulster.

Championship draw

Preliminary round

Quarter-finals

Semi-finals

Final

See also
 2017 All-Ireland Senior Football Championship
 2017 Connacht Senior Football Championship
 2017 Leinster Senior Football Championship
 2017 Munster Senior Football Championship

References

2U
2017 in Northern Ireland sport
Ulster Senior Football Championship